Kasey Silem Mohammad is an American poet and professor at Southern Oregon University.
He is one of the Flarf poets.

Life
Mohammad was born in Modesto, California, in 1962. He graduated with a BA from the University of California, Santa Cruz in 1991, and from Stanford University with a PhD in 1998. His work has appeared in numerous journals and anthologies, including Poetry, The Nation, Fence, Postmodern American Poetry: A Norton Anthology, and Against Expression: An Anthology of Conceptual Writing. He edits the literary journals West Wind Review and Abraham Lincoln: A Magazine of Poetry. He currently teaches creative writing at Southern Oregon University.

Works
 Sonnagrams 1-20, Slack Buddha Press, 2009   
 The Front, Roof Books, 2009, 
 Breathalyzer, Edge Books, 2008, 
 A Thousand Devils, Combo Books, 2004, 
 Deer Head Nation, Tougher Disguises, 2003, 

Non-fiction

References

External links
Author's website
"K. Silem Mohammad", PennSound
Tom Beckett, "Interview with K. Silem Mohammad ", e-x-c-h-a-n-g-e-v-a-l-u-e-s, June 28, 2005

Living people
21st-century American poets
University of California, Santa Cruz alumni
Stanford University alumni
Southern Oregon University faculty
1962 births
People from Modesto, California
Poets from California